St Giles’ Church, Longstone (also known as St Giles' Church, Great Longstone) is a Grade I listed parish church in the Church of England in Great Longstone, Derbyshire.

History

The church dates from the 13th century with 14th and 16th century additions. It was restored between 1872 and 1873 by Richard Norman Shaw. The church was restored sensitively with much re-use of original material as possible. The levels of floor throughout were re-arranged, and the church seated with open oak seats. New choir stalls were placed in the chancel, and a low stone screen of simple character was erected between the chancel and the nave. A new vestry and organ chamber was provided. The contractors for the restoration work were Joseph Brown and Co. Stained glass windows designed by Richard Norman Shaw were constructed by Heaton, Butler and Bayne. The bells were cast by Taylor of Loughborough, and the tower clock provided by Smiths of Derby. The church reopened on 22 September 1873

Parish status
The church is in a joint parish with 
All Saints' Church, Curbar
St Martin's Church, Stoney Middleton
The Good Shepherd Church, Wardlow

Organ

The church contains a pipe organ by Chappell and Co dating from 1873. A specification of the organ can be found on the National Pipe Organ Register.

See also
Grade I listed churches in Derbyshire
Grade I listed buildings in Derbyshire
Listed buildings in Great Longstone

References

Church of England church buildings in Derbyshire
Grade I listed churches in Derbyshire